Don Hiney was a Canadian football player who played for the Winnipeg Blue Bombers. He played college football at the University of North Dakota.

References

Possibly living people
Canadian football quarterbacks
Winnipeg Blue Bombers players
Canadian football running backs
North Dakota Fighting Hawks football players
American players of Canadian football